Katarzia (born Katarína Kubošiová; 9 February 1989) is a Slovak singer of pop music and songwriter. Her song "Kde sa slzy berú" was named best single of 2017 at the Radio Head Awards. Her songwriting has also been recognised; alongside Jonatán Pastirčák she composed music and lyrics for the Slovak National Theatre's adaption of the Sophocles play Antigone. It was recognised as Best Incidental Music at the 2018 DOSKY Awards. Kubošiová studied at the Academy of Performing Arts in Bratislava, and is the daughter of actress Eva Pavlíková.

Discography

Studio albums
2013: Generácia Y
2016: Agnostika
2018: Antigona
2020: Celibát

Awards and nominations

References

External links

1989 births
Living people
21st-century Slovak women singers
Slovak singer-songwriters
People from Nitra